Southdown PSV Limited, trading as Southdown Buses, is a medium-sized country bus operator, with 18 routes across East Surrey, West Sussex, South London and Kent, 9 of which are school bus routes. Most of their routes are operated on behalf of Surrey County Council, other work includes railway replacement services for planned engineering work.

Southdown Buses operates mainly in Oxted, Horley, Redhill, Westerham,  Lingfield, Caterham, and East Grinstead. Their only operating garage is in Copthorne. 

On 1 February 2023, Southdown PSV was purchased by the Go-Ahead Group, with the company being brought under the control of Brighton & Hove and the Southdown PSV identity retained.

Services
All Southdown PSV services are operated from the company's depot in Copthorne. 

Southdown PSV currently operate the following services (excluding school services):

Fleet
As of August 2022, Southdown PSV operates a fleet of 30 buses. The fleet consists of a mixture of Volvo B7TL Plaxton President, Alexander Dennis Enviro200, Alexander Dennis Enviro200 MMC, N230UD Alexander Dennis Enviro400 and N250UD Alexander Dennis Enviro400 MMC buses.

In 2018, Southdown took delivery of two Alexander Dennis Enviro400 MMC buses based on the Scania N250UD chassis, having trialled a demonstrator the previous year. In 2021, Southdown took delivery of two Alexander Dennis Enviro200 MMC buses.

Dealership
In addition to being a bus operator, Southdown also used to be a new and used bus dealer. In September 2016, the business was split with Southdown managing director, Steve Swain taking over the dealership and renaming it Chartwell Bus & Coach Sales.

References

External links

 Company website

Auto dealerships of the United Kingdom
Bus operators in West Sussex
Bus operators in Surrey
Bus operators in Kent
2002 establishments in England